Ivan Šaponjić (Serbian Cyrillic: Иван Шапоњић; born 2 August 1997) is a Serbian professional footballer who plays as a striker for Turkish club Bandırmaspor, on loan from Slovan Bratislava.

At international level, Šaponjić won the gold medal for Serbia at the 2015 FIFA U-20 World Cup, scoring two goals in the process.

Club career

Partizan
Born in Nova Varoš, Šaponjić started playing football at local clubs Zlatar Nova Varoš and Sloboda Užice before joining the youth academy of Partizan. He made his senior debut for the club in a league game on 30 November 2013, coming on as a 76th-minute substitute in a 2–0 home win over Spartak Subotica. He eventually failed to make any other competitive appearance in the 2013–14 season.

On 30 May 2014, he signed his first professional contract with Partizan, penning a three-year deal. He scored his first competitive goal for the team in a 2–0 away victory over Jagodina in the second leg of the Serbian Cup semi-final on 8 April 2015. Five days later, he scored his first league goal in a 3–1 away win over OFK Beograd. In total, he scored 5 goals in 16 appearances in all competitions during the 2014–15 season.

On 25 July 2015, Šaponjić scored a brace in a 6–0 home league win over Jagodina. He scored his first international goal for Partizan with an overhead kick in a 2–1 home win over BATE Borisov in the return leg of the Champions League play-off round on 26 August 2015. This was the club's 100th victory in European football. He also scored both goals for Partizan in their 2–0 Serbian Cup win over Sinđelić Beograd on 28 October 2015.

Benfica
On 12 January 2016, Šaponjić signed a five-and-a-half-year contract with Portuguese champions Benfica and was immediately assigned to their reserve team. In July 2017, he was loaned out to Belgian club Zulte Waregem.

Atlético Madrid
On 11 July 2019, Šaponjić signed a three-year contract with Atlético Madrid for an undisclosed fee, reported to be in region of 500 thousand euros. He made his debut on 23 January 2020, in a Copa del Rey clash against Cultural Leonesa.

On 22 January 2021, Šaponjić joined fellow La Liga side Cádiz on loan until the end of the season. On 31 January 2021, he made his club debut in a 2–4 home league defeat against his contractual owners, Atlético Madrid.

Slovan Bratislava
In January 2022, Slovan Bratislava announced the signing of Šaponjić on a 3,5 year deal.

International career
Internationally, Šaponjić represented his homeland at various youth levels. He was the team's joint top scorer (alongside Luka Jović) with five goals in their unsuccessful qualification campaign for the 2014 UEFA Under-17 Championship. With three goals, Šaponjić was the team's joint top scorer (again with Jović) in their unsuccessful qualification campaign for the 2015 UEFA Under-19 Championship.

Šaponjić was included in the final 21-man squad for the 2015 FIFA U-20 World Cup. He scored an injury time equalizer against Hungary in the round of 16 on 10 June 2015, with Serbia eventually winning the game 2–1 after extra time. On 17 June 2015, he scored an extra time winning goal in the semi-final against Mali. He was the team's joint top scorer (alongside Nemanja Maksimović, Staniša Mandić and Andrija Živković) with two goals, as Serbia eventually won the tournament.

Career statistics

Club

Honours

Club
Partizan
 Serbian SuperLiga: 2014–15
 Serbian Cup: Runner-up 2014–15

Slovan Bratislava
Fortuna Liga: 2021–22

International
Serbia
 FIFA U-20 World Cup: 2015

Notes

References

External links
 
 
 

1997 births
Living people
People from Nova Varoš
Serbian footballers
Association football forwards
FK Partizan players
S.L. Benfica B players
S.V. Zulte Waregem players
Serbian SuperLiga players
Atlético Madrid footballers
Cádiz CF players
ŠK Slovan Bratislava players
Bandırmaspor footballers
Liga Portugal 2 players
Belgian Pro League players
La Liga players
Slovak Super Liga players
Serbia under-21 international footballers
Serbia youth international footballers
Serbian expatriate footballers
Expatriate footballers in Portugal
Expatriate footballers in Belgium
Expatriate footballers in Spain
Expatriate footballers in Slovakia
Expatriate footballers in Turkey
Serbian expatriate sportspeople in Portugal
Serbian expatriate sportspeople in Belgium
Serbian expatriate sportspeople in Spain
Serbian expatriate sportspeople in Slovakia
Serbian expatriate sportspeople in Turkey